Lizards are among the most diverse groups of reptiles and include more than 5,600 species. They come in many shapes, sizes, and colors and vary widely in behavioral traits, such as their methods of reproduction and food foraging. In addition to this diversity in physical and behavioral characteristics, lizards have evolved many different ways to communicate.

Lizards rely on sensory systems including the visual, olfactory, and auditory systems. As these sensory systems have evolved, lizards attained different modes of communication that incorporate these sensory systems, including visual, chemical, tactile and vocal communication. Differing modes of communication are well-suited for different lizard habitats; some function well in wet habitats while others are suitable only in habitats with low precipitation. Most modes are associated with particular physical and behavioral traits that are advantageous to the lizard, such as well-developed vision. Different lizard species have unique communication needs and they have evolved solutions to accommodate for those differences.

Methods of lizard communication
The process of "communication" refers to the transfer of information between individuals  (See Animal Communication for additional discussion). One individual (the signaler) sends information to another individual (the receiver), and the receiver modifies its behavior in response to the information it received. 

Similar to body language in humans, lizards and other animals gain information about the individuals around them by paying attention to various characteristics exhibited by those individuals. Lizards use various physical and behavioral traits to communicate, and these traits differ based on the mode of communication being used.

Scenarios for lizard communication
Just like humans and many other animals, lizards need to be able to communicate in a variety of different scenarios. Lizards need to be able to communicate with members of their own species. This type of communication, called intraspecific communication, includes communication associated with finding appropriate mates (called courtship) and competing for resources such as food or habitat. Lizards may consider subtle variation in traits shared by members of the same species when choosing mates, which sometimes results in particular individuals mating more than others. This phenomenon is associated with sexual selection, and is not discussed here (but see Sexual selection in lizards).

In many cases, lizards are also communicating with members of different species, which is called interspecific communication. Some lizards compete with other lizard species for access to resources, and need ways to communicate with one another in the process. Some lizards use interspecific communication during predator-prey interactions. The lizard Anolis cristatellus, for example, exhibits predator deterrence communication—A. cristatellus perform a behavior that communicates information about the lizard's physiological condition to potential predators. Lizards that are in better condition (and may be more likely to outrun the predator) perform this behavior more frequently, and may communicate to the predator that they will be difficult to catch. Thus, the predator may choose to avoid lizards in good condition that are likely to outrun them and choose instead to pursue individuals that do not seem to be in good condition. In this case of interspecific communication, the lizard is communicating information about itself to the predator, and the predator modifies its behavior in response.

Modes of lizard communication
Lizards have many different communication needs, and have evolved several modes of communication to accommodate these needs. These modes include visual, chemical, tactile, and vocal communication. The chemical and visual communication modes are widespread among lizards, while the tactile and vibrational modes seem to occur in just a handful of lizard species. Some species use a combination of several communication modes, while others seem to rely entirely on one. Visual communication is the most well studied mode of lizard communication, but modern scientific techniques are making it easier to study the other modes. Thus, we may find that lizards traditionally thought to rely on one mode of communication may also be using another mode.

Visual communication

Many lizards use visual communication. Lizards that use visual communication gather information by observing various physical and behavioral characteristics of other lizards, somewhat like humans communicating using body language. Lizards that use visual communication often have highly developed visual systems—most can see different colors, and some even see UV light. Many different physical and behavioral traits are used by lizards in visual communication, most of which are obviously designed to draw the visual attention of other lizards.

What sorts of traits draw visual attention? Lizards that use visual communication often possess specialized structures used for communication. These structures often incorporate vibrant colors and striking patterns accompanied by wacky behaviors intended to display these traits, all intended to draw attention during communication. In many cases, these structures are hidden from view except when in use for communication—colors that draw the attention of other lizards may also draw the attention of unwanted audiences, such as predators or competitors. Thus, these colors may be located on a flap of skin that is only visible when the lizard extends it, or on a surface of the body like the belly that is not exposed unless the lizard intends to. Both of these are common in lizards. Many species of Anolis lizards have dewlaps, vibrantly colored throat fans that they extend during behavioral interactions like attracting mates and dueling with competitors. Anolis lizards tend to be fairly well camouflaged apart from the vibrant dewlap color, and often go unnoticed until they extend their dewlaps. Many Sceloporous lizard species also have hidden colors. Some Sceloporous develop vibrant blue and black coloration on their bellies during the breeding season. This color is not visible to other lizards unless the lizard engages in a behavior called dorsal ventral flattening, in which the lizard flattens its body to expose the colorful parts of its belly during behavioral interactions.

Because lizards that use visual communication rely on being able to see other lizards, visual communication is common among species that live at relatively high population densities and frequently come into close contact. Visual communication is well suited for use in many different habitats and can be modified by lizards to accommodate changing habitat conditions [e.g.,], so long as individuals come into contact frequently enough.

Chemical communication
Another mode of communication used by many lizards is chemical communication. Lizards that use chemical communication produce chemicals that they deposit in the environment, such as pheromones. These chemicals elicit changes in the behavior, and sometimes in the physiology, of individuals that encounter them. These chemicals contain unique combinations of chemical compound "ingredients," and different combinations of ingredients can provide information about the individual that produced the chemical. In many cases, chemical composition differs considerably between species, which allows lizards to tell whether a lizard that deposited the chemical was a member of the same or a different species. Even more interesting, in some lizard species (such as the Iberian rock-lizards, Lacerta monticola), their chemical secretions differ based on the individual that produced them. These chemicals are different enough that lizards detecting the chemicals can determine whether the individual that produced the chemical is familiar or not, much like a human knows whether they've met a person before based on unique facial characteristics.

Lizards that use chemical communication have highly developed olfactory systems, which essentially give these lizards a very well developed sense of "smell" and enable them to detect chemicals in the environment. Several physical and behavioral characteristics are common among lizards that use chemical communication. Lizards that produce these chemicals often have femoral glands or femoral pores on their back legs. Chemicals are produced inside the lizard and are then released via these pores. Lizards that use chemical communication are often observed to drag their back legs or lower half of their body against a surface they are walking across. By doing this, they are spreading their chemical secretions across an area, much like you might have seen a dog "marking" its territory. Another behavior common among lizards that use chemical communication is tongue flicking. Similar to what we see snakes doing, lizards that use chemical communication stick out their tongues and "taste" the chemicals present in the air and on various surfaces, such as rocks or logs that another lizard might have been sitting on. These chemicals can also be deposited in feces—lizards have been observed to defecate systematically throughout the area that they live in, suggesting that they may be placing chemicals in particular areas, such as marking the boundaries of a territory.

One unique aspect of chemical communication that differentiates it from other modes is that lizards do not need to come into direct contact in order to communicate using chemicals. Once a chemical has been released onto a surface, it can be used in communication until it is washed away or otherwise removed. Lizards may come into contact with chemicals that were placed there by a lizard hours or even days before, depending on how long the chemical lasts in the environment. Thus, lizards that live at relatively low population densities or do not come into close contact very often can use chemical communication. Because lizards that use chemical communication rely on these chemicals remaining in the environment for some amount of time, chemical communication is usually better suited for use in dry environments. In a wet environment, there is a high chance that precipitation might wash away the chemical.

Recent advances in our ability to detect and measure the compounds present in these chemicals have dramatically increased our understanding of lizard chemical communication. We are finding that many lizards thought to rely on other modes of communication along with chemical communication. As we continue to analyze the composition of these chemicals, we find that they can convey a wealth of information about the individual that produced them, and can function in many different communication contexts.

In Podarcis hispaniscus 
Podarcis hispanicus secretes chemicals that allow for intra-specific communication. Podarcis hispanicus chemical secretions are generally more volatile and have higher chemical stability. In courtship, chemosensory allows for male lizards to identify females during breeding season and identify the female’s special identity. Chemosensory recognition is more sensitive among males as they are greatly utilized in intra-sexual aggression. This also allows for males to recognize its known neighbors and will not engage in anti predatory behaviors. In males lizards, the chemical stimuli is released from the femoral glands.

Tactile communication
Some lizards use tactile communication. The term tactile means touch, and lizards that use tactile communication either use direct or indirect "touch" as a form of communication. Some species come into direct contact with one another, such as nudging, licking, biting, or bumping another lizard. This type of direct contact may be associated with courtship (i.e., attracting a mate), or with aggression—in many lizards, fights can escalate to direct physical contact, such as biting and bumping into one another. Species that engage in these physical conflicts often rely on other forms of communication (such as visual or chemical), and resort only to physical contact when other methods of deterring potential rivals have failed. In the case of courtship, some lizards such as the male Komodo dragon, Varanus komodoensis, lick females to determine whether they are sexually receptive. While this is direct touch, it also incorporates chemical communication, as the male is detecting different chemicals present on the female's body in addition to directly touching her.

There are also forms of tactile communication that do not involve direct touch, including vibrational communication. Some chameleon species communicate with one another by vibrating the substrate that they are standing on, such as a tree branch or leaf. Animals that use vibrational communication exhibit unique adaptations in morphology (i.e., body form) that enable them to detect vibration and use it in communication. These include unique adaptations in ear and jaw morphology that give the animal direct contact with the surface they are standing on, and enable them to detect subtle vibrations. Lizards that live on substrates that can be easily moved (such as thin tree branches or leaves) are probably more likely to use vibrational communication than lizards that live on substrates that do not transmit vibrations as easily, such as the ground or thick tree trunks.

Vocal communication

Finally, a few lizards communicate using vocalizations. This mode of communication is primarily limited to nocturnal geckos, many of which produce vocalizations during behavioral interactions such as male competition or predator avoidance. Another lizard, Liolaemus chiliensis, emits distress calls in the wild. Other lizards can produce vocalizations, but most have not been observed to do so in the wild. For instance, some lizards vocalize when handled, but have not been heard doing so undisturbed in the wild. It is possible that these vocalizations are used for communication, but observations of this behavior in natural populations would be needed to make this assertion. 

Lizards that use vocal communication need to produce vocalizations and need an appropriate auditory system to process the sounds. Vocal communication would be well suited for lizards that live in habitats that make it hard to see other individuals. Vocal communication may also be particularly well suited for lizards that behave at night. Vocal communication would be useful in these settings because it can be used to communicate without needing to come into contact with other lizards, or being able to see them.

References

Animal communication
Lizards